Surigao del Sur's 2nd congressional district is one of the two congressional districts of the Philippines in the province of Surigao del Sur. It has been represented in the House of Representatives since 1987. The district consists of the city of Bislig and the southern municipalities of Barobo, Hinatuan, Lingig and Tagbina. It is currently represented in the 18th Congress by Johnny Pimentel of the PDP–Laban.

Representation history

Election results

2019

2016

2013

2010

See also
Legislative districts of Surigao del Sur

References

Congressional districts of the Philippines
Politics of Surigao del Sur
1987 establishments in the Philippines
Congressional districts of Caraga
Constituencies established in 1987